Thozetella is a genus of fungi in the family Chaetosphaeriaceae. This has been confirmed with analyse of 3 genes (ribosomal DNA and protein coding genes: RNA polymerase II largest subunit (RBP2) and b-tubulin) and morphological comparison.

Type species, Thozetella nivea is saprobic on submerged decaying wood in freshwater in Thailand.

Species Thozetella pinicola was found on leaf litter of Pinus elliottii  in Hong Kong. Species Thozetella pandanicola  is found on members of the Pandanaceae family with other micro-fungi species in China and Thailand. Species Thozetella aculeata was found on leaf litter in Brazil.

The genus was circumscribed by Carl Ernst Otto Kuntze in Revis. gen. pl. (Leipzig) vol.2 on page 873 in 1891.

The genus name of Thozetella is in honour of Anthelme Thozet (1826–1878), who was a French-Australian botanist and ethnographer.

Species
As accepted by Species Fungorum;

 Thozetella acerosa 
 Thozetella aculeata 
 Thozetella bambusicola 
 Thozetella boonjiensis 
 Thozetella buxifolia 
 Thozetella canadensis 
 Thozetella capitata 
 Thozetella coronata 
 Thozetella cristata 
 Thozetella cubensis 
 Thozetella effusa 
 Thozetella fabacearum 
 Thozetella falcata 
 Thozetella gigantea 
 Thozetella havanensis 
 Thozetella lithocarpi 
 Thozetella neonivea 
 Thozetella nivea 
 Thozetella pandanicola 
 Thozetella pindobacuensis 
 Thozetella pinicola 
 Thozetella queenslandica 
 Thozetella radicata 
 Thozetella serrata 
 Thozetella submersa 
 Thozetella tocklaiensis 
 Thozetella ypsiloidea

References

External links

Sordariomycetes genera
Chaetosphaeriales